Isabelle Stone (October 18, 1868 – 1966) was an American physicist and educator. She was one of the founders of the American Physical Society. She was among the first women to be awarded a PhD in physics in the United States.

Early life and education
Stone was born in 1868 to Harriet H. Leonard Stone and Leander Stone in Chicago. She completed a bachelor's degree at Wellesley College in 1890, and was among the first women to gain a PhD in physics in the United States, earning hers just two years after Caroline Willard Baldwin earned a Doctor of Science at Cornell University. Stone completed doctoral work at the University of Chicago. Her 1897 thesis, On the Electrical Resistance of Thin Films, showed that very thin metal films showed a higher resistivity than the bulk metal.

Career 
Stone taught a year at the Bryn Mawr School in Baltimore. She was a physics instructor at Vassar College from 1898 to 1906, and head of the physics department at Sweet Briar College from 1915 to 1923. From 1908 to 1914, she and her sister Harriet Stone ran a school for American girls in Rome, and later in life they ran another school for girls in Washington, D.C.

Stone was one of two women (out of a total of 836) who attended the first International Congress of Physics in Paris (the other being Marie Curie). In 1899, she was one of forty physicists (and one of two women, the other being Marcia Keith) at the first meeting of the American Physical Society, held at Columbia University.

Stone's research was on the electrical resistance and other properties of thin films.

Publications
On the electrical resistance of thin films, January 1898, Physical Review, vol. VI, no. 30
Color in Platinum Films, July 1905, Physical Review (Series I), vol. 21, Issue 1, pp. 27–40
Properties of thin films when deposited in a vacuum

Personal life 
Stone lived with her sister Harriet Stone in Washington, D.C. in her later years. Some of her letters are in the papers of George B. Pegram at Columbia University.

See also
Timeline of women in science

References

External links 
 Melia E. Bonomo (2019). "Isabelle Stone: breaking the glass ceiling with thin films and teaching" essay submitted to APS Forum on the History of Physics, 2019 essay contest

1868 births
1966 deaths
American women physicists
Bryn Mawr College faculty
University of Chicago alumni
Vassar College alumni
Columbia University alumni
19th-century American physicists
20th-century American physicists
19th-century American scientists
19th-century American women scientists
20th-century American women scientists
Bryn Mawr School people
American women academics
19th-century women physicists
20th-century women physicists